Bola de Nieve (literally Snowball) (11 September 1911 – 2 October 1971), born Ignacio Jacinto Villa Fernández, was a Cuban singer-pianist and songwriter. His name originates from his round, black face.

Villa Fernández was born in Guanabacoa, and studied at the Mateu Conservatoire of Havana. He worked as a chauffeur and played piano for silent films until his friend Rita Montaner took him on as an accompanist in the early 1930s. After Montaner returned to Cuba, Villa Fernández remained in Mexico and developed an original performance style as a pianist and singer. He was an elite rather than a popular figure, a sophisticated cabaret stylist known for ironic patter, subtle musical interpretation, with a repertoire that included songs in French, English, Catalan, Portuguese, and Italian. He toured widely in Europe and the Americas, and his friends included Andrés Segovia and Pablo Neruda. He was black and gay, and was self-confident in his personality, and accepted for what he was: a memorable talent.

He died in Mexico City during a musical visit.

He was the subject of a 2003 documentary which included interviews with fellow musicians, friends, relatives, and experts.

Selected filmography
Melodies of America (1941)

References

External links
  

1911 births
1971 deaths
Cuban pianists
20th-century Cuban male singers
Cuban songwriters
Male songwriters
People from Havana
Spanish-language singers
English-language singers
French-language singers
Catalan-language singers
Italian-language singers
Portuguese-language singers
Gay singers
Cuban LGBT musicians
Gay songwriters
20th-century pianists
20th-century composers
Male pianists
20th-century Cuban LGBT people
LGBT people in Latin music